Kansepur is a census town in Yamunanagar district in the Indian state of Haryana.

Demographics
 India census, Kansepur had a population of 14,943. Males constitute 53% of the population and females 47%. Kansepur has an average literacy rate of 71%, higher than the national average of 59.5%: male literacy is 77%, and female literacy is 65%. In Kansepur, 12% of the population is under 6 years of age.current sarpanch is Suresh Rana.

References

Cities and towns in Yamunanagar district